Eun Tin Loy (born 4 March 1939) is a Malaysian weightlifter. He competed in the men's lightweight event at the 1968 Summer Olympics.

References

1939 births
Living people
Malaysian male weightlifters
Olympic weightlifters of Malaysia
Weightlifters at the 1968 Summer Olympics
Place of birth missing (living people)
20th-century Malaysian people